Johnson Parker-Smith (14 January 1882 – 13 July 1926) was a British lacrosse player who competed in the 1908 Summer Olympics. He was part of the British team which won the silver medal. Smith was born in 1882 in Chelford near Macclesfield in Cheshire, his father, also Johnson Parker Smith, was a merchant. Smith became a chartered accountant.

References

External links
Johnnson Parker-Smith's profile at Sports Reference.com

1882 births
1926 deaths
Lacrosse players at the 1908 Summer Olympics
Olympic lacrosse players of Great Britain
Olympic silver medallists for Great Britain
English accountants
Medalists at the 1908 Summer Olympics
Olympic medalists in lacrosse
20th-century English businesspeople